Perideridia bacigalupii is an uncommon species of flowering plant in the family Apiaceae known by the common names Mother Lode yampah and Bacigalupi's perideridia. It is endemic to California, where it is known only from the northern and central Sierra Nevada foothills. It is a member of the flora in chaparral and pine woodlands. It is a perennial herb which may exceed 1.5 meters in maximum height, its slender, erect stem growing from tubers. Leaves near the base of the plant have blades up to 40 centimeters long which are divided into many narrow subdivided lobes. Leaves higher on the plant are smaller and less divided. The inflorescence is a compound umbel of many spherical clusters of small white flowers. These yield ribbed, oblong-shaped fruits about half a centimeter long.

External links
Jepson Manual Treatment
USDA Plants Profile
Photo gallery

bacigalupii
Endemic flora of California
Flora of the Sierra Nevada (United States)
Natural history of the California chaparral and woodlands
Flora without expected TNC conservation status